Mohamed Rished Abdallah (born March 28, 1952) was a Member of Parliament in the National Assembly of Tanzania, representing Pangani. He served as a member of Chama Cha Mapinduzi. He completed a short training in engineering at the University of Baghdad in 1973.

References 

1952 births
Living people
Members of the National Assembly (Tanzania)